Samoa National League is an association football league in Samoa and the top division of the Football Federation Samoa. The 3,500 capacity Toleafoa JS Blatter Soccer Stadium is the sole venue of the national league.

Clubs
Faatoia United
Kiwi
Lepea
Lion of Judah
Lupe o le Soaga (Magiagi)
Moaula United
Sogi
University of South Pacific
Vaipuna
Vaiusu
Vaivase-Tai
Vaitele Uta

Teams as of the 2022 season.

Previous winners

Performances

Topscorers

Hat-tricks

References

External links
League at FIFA
League at soccerway.com

 
Football in Samoa
1
Top level football leagues in Oceania
1979 establishments in Samoa